Though the Ministry of Foreign Affairs (MOFA) is the government agency responsible for the conduct of foreign relations of Nepal, historically, it is the Office of Prime Minister (PMO) that has exercised the authority to formulate and conduct policies related to Nepal's foreign affairs. As a landlocked country wedged between two larger and far stronger powers, Nepal has tried to maintain good relations with both of its neighbors, People's Republic of China and Republic of India. Nepal's relationship with China, India, and the United States has remained utmost priority for successive Nepali governments. The relationship between Nepal and India however was significantly hampered during the 2015 Nepal blockade by pro-Indian anti-Nepal protestors, where the Government of Nepal accused India of using "Russia-Ukraine" tactics to cause unrest along Nepal's southern border using ethnically Indian residents of Nepal. India strictly denied the allegation and said the unrest were solely due to Madheshi protesters. For the most part though, Nepal has traditionally maintained a non-aligned policy and enjoys friendly relations with its neighboring countries and almost all the major countries of the world.

Constitutionally, foreign policy is to be guided by "the principles of the United Nations Charter, nonalignment, Panchsheel (five principles of peaceful coexistence), international law and the value of world peace." In practice, foreign policy has not been directed toward projecting influence internationally but toward preserving autonomy and addressing domestic economic and security issues.

Nepal's most substantive international relations are perhaps with international economic institutions, such as the Asian Development Bank, the International Monetary Fund, the World Bank, and the South Asian Association for Regional Cooperation, a multilateral economic development association. Nepal also has strong bilateral relations with major providers of economic and military aid, such as France, Germany, Japan, South Korea, Switzerland, the United States, and particularly the United Kingdom, with whom military ties date to the nineteenth century. The country's external relations are primarily managed by the Ministry of Foreign Affairs while relations with India, China, and the United States, Nepal's most important partners, is still managed by the Prime Minister's Office. Nepal's relation with China has seen a major upswing in the recent years with China now becoming Nepal's top 5 aid donor to Nepal while the US continues to remain the largest foreign aid donor to Nepal. In 2021, Indian government also announced increment of aid to Nepal by nearly 13% to $130 million, to counter China's growing footprint in Nepal. The data on actual disbursement of aid by Indian government is however unclear.

International disputes

In 1955, when Nepal joined the UN, Nepal had no border disputes with either of its neighbors. Both India and China without any objections, accepted the map of Nepal filed at the UN in 1955.

However, with degradation of relations between India and China during late 1950s, Indian government initiated a 'Forward Policy' along its northern frontiers which resulted in Indian military outposts being built in all unmanned areas along India's northern border. Successive Nepali government's from 1990 onwards, have continued their objection to Indian occupation of certain Nepali territories under the guise of India's 'Forward Policy'. A joint border commission continues to work on resolving the issue of removal of Indian military outpost from Nepal's Kalapani area. , Nepal has border disputes with India at Lipulekh and Kalapani between Darchula district and Uttarakhand and Susta in Bihar and Nawalpur district. In 2018, EPG (Eminent Persons Group), a joint committee between Nepal and India finished a report on the disputed territories between these two countries. The report is yet to be submitted to the head of governments of both countries.

International trade
Nepal has been a member of the World Trade Organization (WTO) since 11 September 2003 and on 24 January 2017 became the 108th WTO member to ratify the WTO's Trade Facilitation Agreement.

Diplomatic relations 

Countries which Nepal has diplomatic relations with:

  – 1816
  – 25 April 1947
  – 13 June 1947
  – 20 April 1949
  – 1 August 1955
  – 20 July 1956
  – 1 September 1956
  – 10 November 1956
  – 1 July 1957
  – 16 July 1957
  – 4 April 1958
  – 15 August 1959
  – 31 August 1959
  – 7 October 1959
  – 25 November 1959
  – 30 November 1959
  – 1 January 1960
  – 12 February 1960
  – 15 February 1960
   – 19 March 1960 
  – 20 March 1960
  – 2 April 1960
  – 20 May 1960
  – 1 June 1960 
  – 10 June 1960 
  – 25 December 1960
  – 5 January 1961 
  – 15 January 1961
  – 1 May 1961
  – 1 July 1961
  – 1 January 1962
  – 1962
  – 2 February 1962
  – 15 November 1962
  – 18 August 1963
  – 19 August 1963
  – 14 December 1964
  – 18 January 1965
  – 20 August 1965
  – 15 December 1967
  – 15 April 1968
  – 20 April 1968 
  – 29 April 1968
  – 13 May 1968
  – 30 October 1968 
  – 25 March 1969
  – 11 July 1969
  – 26 February 1970
  – 15 April 1971
  – 25 February 1972
  – 8 April 1972 
  – 23 May 1972
  – 26 January 1973
  – 15 May 1974
  – 15 May 1974 
  – 21 September 1974
  – 10 January 1975
  – 18 February 1975
  – 25 March 1975
  – 18 April 1975
  – 15 May 1975
  – 3 June 1975
  – 25 November 1975
  – 25 November 1975
  – 20 December 1975
  – 30 December 1975
  – 28 January 1976
  – 7 February 1976
  – 1 September 1976
  – 13 January 1977
  – 21 January 1977
  – 21 January 1977
  – 22 January 1977
  – 15 March 1977
  – 16 August 1977
  – 1 August 1980
  – 18 August 1980
  – 12 February 1981
  – 25 May 1981
  – 3 June 1983 
  – 10 September 1983
  – 25 September 1983
  – 3 February 1984
  – 15 February 1984
  – 14 April 1984
  – 24 October 1984
  – 27 November 1984
  – 17 June 1985
  – 25 December 1985
  – 12 June 1986
  – 10 September 1986
  – 30 September 1986
  – 5 October 1986
  – 28 April 1987
  – 7 May 1987 
  – 21 May 1987
  – 20 April 1992
  – 20 April 1992
  – 15 January 1993
  – 26 March 1993
  – 26 March 1993
  – 19 July 1993
  – 20 July 1993
  – 2 March 1994
  – 4 March 1994
  – 2 June 1994
  – 28 July 1994
  – 28 February 1995
  – 10 October 1996
  – 2 December 1997
  – 6 January 1998
  – 6 February 1998
  – 19 August 1999
  – 12 January 2000
  – 8 February 2000
  – 10 August 2005
  – 13 September 2005
  – 22 September 2005
  – 17 October 2005
  – 21 June 2006
  – 2 August 2006
  – 8 August 2006
  – 18 August 2006
  – 19 September 2006
  – 22 September 2006
  – 22 September 2006
  – 23 May 2007
  – 27 September 2007
  – 28 September 2007
  – 8 January 2009
  – 19 November 2009
  – 18 May 2010
  – 18 July 2011
  – 15 December 2011
  – 18 April 2012
  – 15 May 2012
  – 4 December 2012
  – 11 December 2012
  – 28 March 2013
  – 12 April 2013
  – 30 June 2015
  – 1 October 2015
  – 12 May 2016
  – 21 September 2016
  – 12 June 2017
  – 16 June 2017
  – 14 July 2017
  – 25 July 2017
  – 3 August 2017
  – 17 August 2017
  – 20 September 2017
  – 31 October 2017
  – 7 November 2017
  – 24 November 2017
  – 9 December 2017
  – 29 December 2017
  – 23 January 2018
  – 26 January 2018
  – 30 May 2018
  – 6 June 2018
  – 20 July 2018
  – 26 September 2018
  – 11 October 2018
  – 22 March 2019
  – 30 April 2019
  – 9 May 2019
  – 27 August 2019
  – 25 September 2019
  – 30 April 2021
  – 24 May 2021
  – 29 June 2021
 –  8 December 2021
 – 11 February 2022
 – 21 March 2022
 – 28 March 2022
 – 1 April 2022
 – 16 June 2022
 – 17 February 2023

Bilateral relations

Afghanistan

Argentina

Nepal and Argentina established diplomatic relations on January 1, 1962. The relations between Nepal and Argentina are based on goodwill, friendship and mutual understanding. The Argentinean Government has shown interest to extend technical cooperation on leather processing industries in Nepal under the South-South Cooperation. However, the Argentinean proposal has not materialized yet. Nepal's trade balance with Argentina is in favour of Argentina. There is no significant figure of export from Nepal. Major commodities imported by Nepal from Argentina are Crude soybean oil, soybean oil, vegetable waxes, sunflower oil and maize.

Austria

Bangladesh

Nepal has good bilateral relations with Bangladesh. Though Nepal views Bangladesh as an access to the sea, and seaports in Bangladesh as alternatives to the Indian seaport in Calcutta, successive governments in Nepal have failed in increasing the connectivity between Nepal and Bangladesh, and consequently, the volume of trade between Bangladesh and Nepal remains inconsequential. Till a decade ago, Bangladesh was the only country in the neighborhood with which Nepal enjoyed a positive trade balance. Recent initiatives like BBIN (Bhutan-Bangladesh-India-Nepal connectivity project), are being discussed as a potential tool for Nepal to address its connectivity issues, which still remains one of the poorest and the least connected country in the world. On May 28, 2009, a four-member delegation from Nepal visited Bangladesh and had talks on increasing trade and other relations. The meeting considered the movement of goods between the two countries in trucks transiting through India's Siliguri corridor territory. It also discussed the use of Mongla port in Bangladesh for transporting goods to and from Nepal at a concession rate. To promote tourism, travel agents and tour operators of both countries would jointly coordinate necessary steps.
Bangladesh transport experts note that following the visit of Bangladesh prime minister to India in January 2010, India agreed to provide transit facilities to Nepal by road and rail. Meanwhile, the Bangladesh Railway is working to find the most convenient route for rail transit to Nepal after India's positive response, according to Bangladesh Railway officials.

Nepal welcomed Bangladesh's independence on 16 January 1972. The turning point for the two nations occurred in April 1976, when the two nations signed, a four-point agreement on technical cooperation, trade, transit and civil aviation. They both seek cooperation in the fields of power generation and development of water resources. In 1986, relations further improved when Bangladesh insisted Nepal should be included on a deal regarding the distribution of water from the Ganges River. Also recently Nepal and Bangladesh had signed MOU's that Nepal would sell 10,000 MW of electricity to Bangladesh once its larger projects are completed.

Many foreign policy experts in Nepal, nowadays, advocate that Bangladesh should be provided a full-fledged ally status, and, that Nepal should seek political, economic, security and all possible assistance from Bangladesh while dealing with Nepal's hegemonic neighbor India to address Nepal's interest, as Nepal on its own lacks the economic and diplomatic weight to deal with India. However, people familiar with the political culture of politics in Nepal remain highly skeptical of such a possibility and instead point to the fact that Nepal is on the verge of losing even more of its strategic autonomy because of the insertion of Indian fifth column – the madheshis, in Nepal's power structure.

Bhutan

Relations with Bhutan have been strained since 1992 over the nationality and possible repatriation of refugees from Bhutan.

Canada

Many Nepalese politicians and government officials criticized Canadian diplomats in the aftermath of the Kabul attack on Canadian Embassy guards in which the majority of victims were Nepalese citizens. Members of Parliament were among those who were critical of the way that Canada treated its security contractors at the embassy, leading to meetings in Ottawa between Nepalese and Canadian diplomats, including ambassador Nadir Patel.

China

Nepal formally established relations with the People's Republic of China on August 1, 1955. The two countries share 1414 kilometers long border in the Himalayan range along the northern side of Nepal. Nepal has established its embassy in Beijing, opened consulates general in Lhasa, Hong Kong and Guangzhou and appointed an honorary consul in Shanghai.

Economic Cooperation

The Nepal-China economic cooperation dates back to the formalization of bilateral relations in 1950's. The first "Agreement between China and Nepal on "Economic Aid" was signed in October 1956. From the mid-80s the Chinese Government has been pledging grant assistance to the government of Nepal under the Economic and Technical Cooperation Program in order to implement mutually acceptable developmental projects.

The Chinese assistance to Nepal falls into three categories: Grants (aid gratis), interest free loans and concessional loans. These assistance of various kinds would be provided to Nepal via: different sources. The Chinese financial and technical assistance to Nepal has been greatly contributed to Nepal's development efforts in the areas of infrastructure building, industrialization process, human resource development, health, education, water resources, sports and the like.

Some of the major on-going projects under Chinese assistance include:

1. Upper Trishuli Hydropower Project- Power station and Transmission Line Projects (Concessional loan)
2. Food/ Material Assistance (Grant) in 15 bordering districts of northern Nepal.
3. Kathmandu Ring Road Improvement Project with Flyover Bridges -(Grant)
4. Tatopani Frontier Inspection Station Project (Construction of ICDs at Zhangmu-Kodari)- (Grant)
5. Pokhara International Regional Airport (Loan)

With the signing of the Memorandum of Understanding on Cooperation under the Belt and Road Initiative on 12 May 2017 in Kathmandu between Nepal and China, new avenues for bilateral cooperation in the mutually agreed areas are expected to open. Nepal expects to upgrade its vital infrastructures, enhance cross-border connectivity with China and enhance people-to-people relations under this initiative. The major thrust of the MoU is to promote mutually beneficial cooperation between Nepal and China in various fields such as economy, environment, technology and culture. The MoU aims at promoting cooperation on policy exchanges, trade connectivity, financial integration and connectivity of people.

The Government of the People's Republic of China provided substantial and spontaneous support in search, relief and rescue efforts of Nepal following the devastating earthquakes of 2015. China has provided 3 billion Yuan on Nepal's Reconstruction to be used in the jointly selected 25 major projects for 2016–2018 period. On 23 December 2016, Nepal and the People's Republic of China signed Agreement on Economic and Technical Cooperation in Beijing to provide grant assistance of RMB 1 billion to the Government of Nepal for implementing the Syaphrubesi-Rasuwagadhi Highway Repair and Improvement Project, Upgrading and Renovation Project of Civil Service Hospital, and Mutually agreed Post-Disaster Reconstruction Projects. The Letters of Exchange to initiate Syaphrubesi-Rasuwagadhi Highway Repair and Improvement Project was signed on May 9, 2017.

Trade and Investment

China is the second largest trading partner of Nepal. In 2015/16, total exports to China stood at US$181 million with marginal increase from US$179 million in the previous fiscal year. In contrast, import from China has been growing at the rate of 39 per cent per year. It rose from US$421 million in fiscal year 2009/10 to US$1,247 million in fiscal year 2015/16. As a result, the trade deficit with China has risen from US$401 million in 2009/10 to US$1228 million in 2015/16. Although, China has given zero tariff entry facility to over 8000 Nepali products starting from 2009, Nepal has not been able to bring the trade deficit down. Nepal exports 370 products including noodles and agro products to China. Nepal regularly participates various trade fairs and exhibitions organized in China. Nepal-China's Tibet Economic and Trade Fair is the regular biannual event hosted by either side alternatively to enhance business interaction and promote economic cooperation between Nepal and TAR. The 15th Nepal China's Tibet Economic and Trade Fair was held on 17–22 November 2015 in Bhrikutimandap, Kathmandu Nepal.

Nepal-China Non-Governmental Cooperation Forum established in 1996, which is led by the President of the Federation of the Nepali Chambers of Commerce and Industry (FNCCI) on the Nepali side and the Vice Head of the All-China Federation of Industry and Commerce (ACFIC) from the Chinese side. It is an initiative to mobilize the apex business organization of both sides to enhance cooperation between the private sectors of two sides. The 14th meeting of the Forum concluded in Kathmandu on 25–26 May 2017.

China is the largest source of Foreign Direct Investment in Nepal since 2015. Chinese investors have shown intent to spend over $8.3 billion in Nepal during the Nepal Investment Summit concluded in Kathmandu in March 2017.

Tourism

China is the 2nd largest source of foreign tourist to Nepal. Over 100 thousands Chinese tourists visit Nepal annually. China has designated Nepal as the first tourist destination in South Asia for its people. The Government of Nepal has waived visa fees for the Chinese tourist effective from 1 January 2016. The Chinese Government has announced the year 2017 as Nepal Tourism Promotion Year in China. Both sides have been carrying out joint efforts to promote Nepal in China and encourage Chinese enterprises to invest in Nepal's tourism sectors. Nepal has road connectivity via Rasuwagadhi and Zhangmu for trade and international travelers. There are 4 other border points designated for bilateral trade. Nepal has direct air link with Lhasa, Chengdu, Kunming, Guangzhou and Hong Kong SAR of China.

Education and Cultural Cooperation

China provides scholarships every year not exceeding a total of 100 Nepali students studying in China. The Chinese side has been providing Chinese language training for 200 tourism entrepreneurs of Nepal for the next five years as per the understanding reached between two sides in March 2016. Both sides have been carrying out activities in culture and youth sectors as per the provisions of the MoU on Cultural Cooperation-1999 and MoU on Youth Exchange-2009. Both sides have been promoting people-to-people relations through regular hosting of cultural festival, friendly visits of the peoples of different walks of public life, exhibition, cultural and film show, food festivals etc. Sister city relations between the cities of two countries are growing and both sides have agreed to push cooperation though such relations. These relations are basically meant for carrying out exchanges and cooperation in the fields of economy, trade, transportation, science and technology, culture, tourism, education, sports and health, personnel, etc.

Regional and International Affairs

Nepal is the founding member of the AIIB. Nepal holds the observer status in the Shanghai Cooperation Organization. Both countries are also the member of the Asia Cooperation Dialogue. China is the observer of the SAARC. Both countries have been cooperating each other in various regional and UN forums on the matters of common concerns.

Though Nepal initially let Tibetans Khampa rebels to make use of Nepalese territory in early 1960s, bilateral relations have generally been very good from 1975 onwards, after annexation of Kingdom of Sikkim by India in 1975. As many as twenty thousand Tibetan refugees live in Nepal and this has been a major issue of concern between China and Nepal. Kathmandu has in several instances been cracking down on the activities of the Tibetans receiving international condemnation. In 2005, Nepalese Foreign Minister Ramesh Nath Pandey called China "an all weather friend" and King Gyanendra's regime was also instrumental in inducting China into the SAARC. Nepalese in general, hold a positive view about the influence of China. In recent years, China has been one of the largest aid donors to Nepal just behind the United Kingdom, Japan and the United States. China has also been the largest source country for foreign direct investment (FDI) into Nepal from 2015 onward.

Denmark

See Denmark–Nepal relations.

European Union

Nepal formally tied diplomatic relations with the EU in 1975. EU established its Technical Office at Kathmandu in 1992. Nepal established residential embassy in Brussels in 1992. EU Delegation office in Kathmandu has been upgraded to the Ambassadorial level since 2009 December.

Development Cooperation:

EU is the largest development partner and the second largest trade partner (if taken as a single trade bloc) of Nepal. Until 2013, EU assistance to Nepal was provided in two main ways: on a bilateral basis through the formulation of successive Country Strategy Papers (CSPs) in close partnership with the Government of Nepal and on a multilateral basis including all actions outside the CSP mainly funded through thematic budget lines. Looking at the history of CSP's for Nepal, the first CSP 2001–2006 allocated €70 million, and, the second CSP 2007–2013 allocated €114 million for Nepal. Cumulative contribution from EU to Nepal's development has reached 360 million Euro spread over more than 70 projects till 2013.
Starting from 2014, the EU has begun channeling its development cooperation under its Multi-Annual Indicative Program (MIP). The EU has increased its development cooperation to Nepal by threefold for the current period of 2014–2020 compared to the proceeding period of the same duration. The MIP had identified three focal sectors for Nepal: €146 million for sustainable rural development, with focus on agricultural productivity and value addition, job creation, market access infrastructure, and nutrition (40.5%); €136.4 million for education, with the aim to improving basic education, quality, livelihood skills and equity for vulnerable and disadvantaged  (38%); €74 million for strengthening democracy and decentralization, including its engagement in the area of public finance management reform efforts of the government at local and national level (20.5%); and remaining €3.6 million for other support measures (1%). The EU is also a major donor partner of the Nepal Peace Trust Fund.

Cooperation with European Investment Bank (EIB):

Nepal and EIB signed an umbrella agreement for financial cooperation on 7 May 2012 paving the way for major investments from EIB in Nepal's infrastructure and energy sectors. Following the agreement EIB has already committed a loan assistance of Euro 55 million for Tanahu Hydropower Project (140 MW) which has a total cost of US$500 million. EIB has also expressed its commitments on immediate additional concessional loan assistance of Rs. 1.5 billion for the same project. Talks are underway for EIB investment of $120 million for Kaligandaki-Marsyangdi Corridor Transmission Project, and $30 million for upgrading the Trishuli Corridor Transmission Line.  Ms. Magdalena Alvarez Arza, Vice President of the European Investment Bank visited Nepal in June 2014 to work out on those commitments.

Trade:

The EU is one of the principal trading partners of Nepal, second largest export market with 13% share. The EU imports mainly handmade carpets, textile, gems and jewellery, wood and paper products, leather products, etc. from Nepal.  Nepal imports engineering goods, telecommunication equipment, chemical and minerals, metal and steel, agricultural products, etc. from the EU countries.

The EU started providing duty-free and quota-free facilities to the Nepalese exports under its Everything But Arms (EBA) policy for the LDCs from 2001. EU introduced the new Generalised System of Preferences (GSP) in 2006 which will remain valid till 2015.  Under this scheme, for nearly 2,100 products out of 11,000, except arms and ammunitions, the EU duty rate will be zero.

Humanitarian Aid:

The European Commission is one of the biggest sources of humanitarian aid to Nepal. It has long been associated with the efforts of disaster management and mitigation projects in Nepal. EU Humanitarian Aid and Civil Protection Department (ECHO) has provided over Euro 74 million worth of humanitarian aid to Nepal since 2001 A.D. As a gesture of European solidarity to help those who are worst affected by the recent monsoon floods, the EU Delegation office in Kathmandu has provided Euro 250,000 assistance to flood affected people of mid-western region of Nepal in September 2014.

Finland

France

Nepal and the French Republic entered into diplomatic relations on 20 April 1949. Bilateral economic cooperation programme commenced in February 1981 when the two countries signed the First Protocol amounting to French Franc 50 million loan which was converted into debt in 1989. Food aid and the counterpart funds that it generated have been the main form of aid since 1991. Main areas of cooperation are national seismologic network, petroleum exploration, restructuring of Water Supply Corporation, the Kavre Integrated Project and Gulmi and Arghakhanchi Rural Development Project, rehabilitation of airports, 'food for work', and others.

Nepal and France have signed an agreement concerning Reciprocal Promotion and Protection of Investment in 1983. The major areas of French investment are hotels, restaurants, medicine, aluminium windows and doors, vehicle body building sectors. Alcatelhad became the leading supplier of the Nepal Telecommunication Corporation, with 200,000 lines installed, and fibre optic cables. Cegelec secured a 24 million dollars contract in respect of the construction of Kali Gandaki hydroelectric project.

The Government of Nepal awarded a contract to Oberthur Technologies of France in 2010, for printing, supply, and delivery of Machine Readable Passports. A significant number of French tourists (24,097 in 2014, 16, 405 in 2015, and, 20,863 in 2016) arrive in Nepal from France each year.

India

As close neighbours, India and Nepal share a unique relationship of friendship and cooperation characterized by open borders and deep-rooted people-to-people contacts of kinship and culture. There has been a long tradition of free movement of people across the borders. The India-Nepal Treaty of Peace and Friendship of 1950 forms the bedrock of the special relations that exist between India and Nepal.

Political:

Beginning with the 12-Point understanding reached between the Seven Party Alliance and the Maoists at Delhi in November 2005, Government of India has welcomed the road-map laid down by the historic Comprehensive Peace Agreement of November 2006 towards political stabilization in Nepal, through peaceful reconciliation and inclusive democratic processes. India has consistently responded with a sense of urgency to the needs of the people and Government of Nepal in ensuring the success of the peace process and institutionalization of multi–party democracy through the framing of a new Constitution by a duly elected Constituent Assembly. India has always believed that only an inclusive Constitution with the widest possible consensus by taking on board all stakeholders would result in durable peace and stability in Nepal. India's core interest in Nepal is a united Nepal's peace and stability which has a bearing on India as well because of the long and open border shared between India and Nepal. Nepal's second Constituent Assembly promulgated a Constitution on 20 September 2015 amid protests by Madhes-based parties and other groups. The Government of India has expressed grave concern regarding the ongoing protests and has urged the Government of Nepal to make efforts to resolve all issues including the new citizenship laws through a credible political dialogue.

Economic:

Indian firms are the biggest investors in Nepal, accounting for about 38.3% of Nepal's total approved foreign direct investments. Till 15 July 2013, the Government of Nepal had approved a total of 3004 foreign investment projects with proposed FDI of Rs. 7269.4 crore. There are about 150 operating Indian ventures in Nepal engaged in manufacturing, services (banking, insurance, dry port, education and telecom), power sector and tourism industries. Some large Indian investors include ITC, Dabur India, Hindustan Unilever, VSNL, TCIL, MTNL, State Bank of India, Punjab National Bank, Life Insurance Corporation of India, Asian Paints, CONCOR, GMR India, IL&FS, Manipal Group, MIT Group Holdings, Nupur International, Transworld Group, Patel Engineering, Bhilwara Energy, Bhushan Group, Feedback Ventures, RJ Corp, KSK Energy, Berger Paints, Essel Infra Project Ltd. and Tata Power etc.  In 2021, India increased the aid to Nepal by nearly 13% to Rs15.87 billion and has remained one of Nepal's important bilateral aid donor over the years. The grant pledged by the Indian government for Nepal is the second highest among South Asian countries consistently, however data from India's Ministry of External Affairs show that the actual disbursement of funds by Indian government to Nepal-related projects is actually one of the lowest among SAARC countries.

Development Assistance:

Government of India provides substantial financial and technical development assistance to Nepal, which is a broad-based programme focusing on creation of infrastructure at the grass-root level, under which various projects have been implemented in the areas of infrastructure, health, water resources, education and rural & community development. In recent years, India has been assisting Nepal in development of border infrastructure through upgradation of roads in the Terai areas; development of cross-border rail links at Jogbani–Biratnagar, Jaynagar-Bardibas, Nepalgunj Road-Nepalgunj, Nautanwa-Bhairhawa, and New Jalpaigudi-Kakarbhitta; and establishment of Integrated Check Posts at Raxaul-Birgunj, Sunauli-Bhairhawa, Jogbani-Biratnagar, and Nepalgunj Road-Nepalgunj. The total economic assistance extended under 'Aid to Nepal' budget in FY 2014–15 was Rs. 300 crore.

Currently, 36 intermediate and large projects such as construction of a National Police Academy at Panauti, Nepal Bharat Maitri Pashupati Dharmashala at Tilganga, a Polytechnic at Hetauda, and the National Trauma Centre at Kathmandu are at various stages of implementation. In addition, Government of India's Small Development Projects (SDPs) programme in Nepal extends assistance for the implementation of projects costing less than NRs 5 crore (approx. INR 3.125 crore) in critical sectors such as health, education & community infrastructure development. So far, 243 SDPs have been completed and 233 are under various stages of implementation in 75 districts of Nepal, with a total outlay of over Rs 550 crore. Till date, India has gifted 502 ambulances and 98 school buses to various institutions and health posts across Nepal's 75 districts.

Education:

GOI provides around 3000 scholarships/seats annually to Nepali nationals for various courses at the Ph.D/Masters, Bachelors and plus–two levels in India and in Nepal.

Indian Community in Nepal:

An estimated 1,500,000 Indian citizens are living/domiciled in Nepal, contributing $3.2 billion in remittances from Nepal to India annually. However, only 600,000 Indian citizens have registered their name and paperwork with the Indian embassy in Kathmandu.

Israel

Nepal was the first and until recently the only nation in South and Central Asia to establish diplomatic ties with Israel. The bilateral relation between the two countries has been good. Traditionally, Nepal votes in favor of Israel at the UN and abstains from resolution opposed by the Israeli government barring few exceptions. Israel-Nepal relations are based on mutual security concerns.

Bishweshwar Prasad Koirala, Prime Minister of Nepal from 1959 to 1960, had a strongly pro-Israel foreign policy. King Mahendra visited Israel in 1963 and maintained Koirala's special relationship. Nepal has continued to maintain strong diplomatic ties with Israel despite numerous change in government.

Japan

Nepal-Japan relations date back to the late eighteenth century. The relationship became formal with the establishment of diplomatic relations on 1 September 1956. The Embassy of Nepal was established in Tokyo in 1965 and Japan established its embassy in Kathmandu in 1967. Nepal has honorary consulates in Osaka and Fukuoka. Japan is one of the largest aid donors to Nepal.

Economic Cooperation:

Japan has been contributing to the socio-economic development of Nepal since 1954. Japan has been assisting Nepal in the form of bilateral grant, bilateral loan, multilateral aid and technical assistance. Japan has been assisting Nepal for the promotion of peace and democracy by contributing to the socio-economic development of the country. The major areas of Japan's economic cooperation have been human resource development, social sectors including health, agriculture development, infrastructure development, environment protection, water supply, culture, etc. Japan also provides concessional loan for the infrastructure development in Nepal. Tanahun Hydro and Nagdhunga tunnel projects are ongoing projects under this scheme.
On human resource development, Japan has been providing annual scholarships to Government officials of Nepal in various fields under the JDS scheme starting from 2016. The Government of Japan started providing technical training to Nepali since Japan joined the Colombo Plan in 1954. Japan has also been providing Japan Overseas Cooperation Volunteers (JOCV) and Senior Volunteers to Nepal under JICA Volunteer Program. JOCV Nepal program was launched in 1970. The Government and people of Japan extended spontaneous support in the aftermath of 2015 earthquakes in Nepal. The Japanese Government made over NRS 26 billion grant for reconstruction works in Nepal.

Trade and Investment:

Japan is one of the important trading partners of Nepal. Nepal exports pashmina products, ready-made garments, woolen goods, carpets, handicrafts, Nepali paper and paper products, leather goods, and silverware and ornaments. Nepal's imports from Japan include vehicles and spare parts, electronic goods, machinery and equipment, iron and steel products, photographic goods, medical equipment and fabric. There is an ample scope of collaborating in trade sector by introducing Japanese production process or integrating product development by exporting niche raw materials in Japan. Japan is one of major sources of Foreign Direct Investment in Nepal. The total FDI amount for the 2015/16 was NRS 223.4 billion.

Nepali Diaspora in Japan: The number of Nepali nationals living in Japan is now more than 60,000, which was only 31,531 at the end of 2013. Nepali community is 5th largest foreign communities in Japan. Every year over 10,000 Nepali students go to Japan to pursue higher studies and Japanese languages. Japan is the 2nd most preferred destination for abroad study to the Nepali students.

Malaysia

Malaysia has an embassy in Kathmandu, and Nepal has an embassy in Kuala Lumpur. Both countries established diplomatic relations on 1 January 1960, with bilateral relations between Malaysia and Nepal have developed from historic grounds.

Mexico

Both nations established diplomatic relations in 1975.

 Mexico is accredited to Nepal from its embassy in New Delhi, India and maintains an honorary consulate in Kathmandu.
 Nepal is accredited to Mexico from its embassy in Washington, D.C., United States and maintains an honorary consulate in Mexico City.

Norway

Diplomatic relations were established on 26 January 1973. Norway established an embassy in Kathmandu in 2000. Norway's aid to Nepal was around 32 million USD in 2017. Norwegian aid prioritizes education, good governance and energy.

In 2008, Norwegian Prime Minister Jens Stoltenberg and Minister of the Environment and International Development Erik Solheim visited Nepal. In 2009, Prime Minister Prachanda visited Norway. In May 2008, a small bomb exploded outside the Norwegian embassy in Kathmandu. No one was injured.

Pakistan

The bilateral relations between Nepal and the Islamic Republic of Pakistan were fully established between 1962 and 1963.

Russia

Serbia

A number of bilateral agreements have been concluded and are in force between both countries.

Spain

South Korea

In addition to the in-kind and monetary donations and emergency relief workers sent by the government of the Republic of Korea immediately after the latest earthquake in Nepal the Korean government provided grant aid worth 10 million US dollars to assist with Nepal's recovery and reconstruction efforts.

Turkey

United Kingdom

United States

Nepal and the United States established the diplomatic relations between them on 25 April 1947.

See also
 Ministry of Foreign Affairs (Nepal)
 1950 Indo-Nepal Treaty of Peace and Friendship
 List of diplomatic missions in Nepal
 List of diplomatic missions of Nepal

References

External links
 Ministry of Foreign Affairs of Nepal
 Permanent Mission of the Kingdom of Nepal to the United Nations
 https://web.archive.org/web/20090904225228/http://www.mofa.gov.np/bilateral/nepal-russia.php